Travis Lazarus "Travie" McCoy (born August 5, 1981) is an American rapper, singer, and songwriter. He is the co-founder and former lead vocalist of the rap rock band Gym Class Heroes, in addition to having a solo career.  McCoy became involved with punk rock scenes as a teenager. He formed the band Gym Class Heroes with childhood friend Matt McGinley; after several line-up changes, the group was signed to Fueled by Ramen, which released their debut album.

Gym Class Heroes took a three-year hiatus from music, leaving McCoy to focus on his solo career; McCoy released, under T-Pain's label Nappy Boy Entertainment, his debut solo album, Lazarus, in 2010. The lead single from the album, "Billionaire" (featuring Bruno Mars), peaked at number four on the Billboard Hot 100 and number three on the UK Singles Chart.

In 2021, McCoy signed with Hopeless Records and released his first single in six years "A Spoonful Of Cinnamon" on June 18.

Early life
McCoy was born and raised in Geneva, New York. His father is Haitian and his mother is of Native American and  Irish descent. As a child, McCoy used a wheelchair for four months after a skateboarding accident; his lack of mobility allowed him to focus on art. When he was 15, McCoy worked in a tattoo parlor as an apprentice, and shortly after, he began tattooing his friends. As a teenager, McCoy was a fan of hardcore punk bands such as Snapcase and Earth Crisis, as well as underground rap acts such as Company Flow and the Arsonists. He says of his musical tastes "I was never a typical hip-hop kid. I didn't want to be pigeonholed." McCoy frequently took buses down to Manhattan, New York, throughout high school to participate in battle raps at the indie rap club Fat Beats.

McCoy played the drums in high school and created a rap group with his father and his brother called "True Life Playas", and says of the experience, "It was so bad! The tapes exist somewhere but hopefully they'll never be found." In high school, he met future bandmate Matt McGinley in his gym class and the two bonded over a common interest in music, in particular punk rock, indie rock, and hip hop. They decided to start a band and played with other musicians until Gym Class Heroes was formed in 1997. After graduating from Geneva High School, McCoy attended art school at Munson-Williams-Proctor Arts Institute and majored in fine arts and illustration. However, he dropped out at age 20 to focus on his tattoo work and his musical career. At one time, McCoy was working at a tattoo parlor, teaching art at a Boys & Girls Club in the daytime, and working at a gas station at night. He decided to quit all three jobs and work on art full-time, opening an art show with his friend. He lived off of the money he made from selling paintings before Gym Class Heroes became successful.

Career

McCoy made his MTV debut in the summer of 2002, as he appeared on stage at the beach house, winning a standard nationwide MC battle that was held on the MTV show Direct Effect.

Gym Class Heroes
McCoy and Matt McGinley became friends at their local high school's gym class in ninth grade in Geneva, New York. They officially formed the group  in 1997. The band originated when bassist Ryan Geise and drummer McGinley were performing at a party in a band with no vocals.  McCoy, who was in attendance at the party, took the microphone onstage and started rapping. A week later, the group came together and started making music.  A prominent opening act for Gym Class Heroes was the critically acclaimed hip-hop group "ModifiedBlockStyle." After the addition of guitarist Disashi Lumumba-Kasongo and bassist Eric Roberts, Gym Class Heroes was signed to Fueled by Ramen and Decaydance Records, Pete Wentz's independent record label.

On the label, the band released the gold-selling album As Cruel as School Children. Since that release, the band's single "Cupid's Chokehold" reached #3 on the UK Singles Chart and #4 on the Billboard Hot 100. "Clothes Off!!" and "Cookie Jar" peaked at #5 and #6 on the UK Singles Chart. They have collaborated with Fall Out Boy's Patrick Stump  on numerous occasions, notably for providing backing vocals on the song "Cupid's Chokehold". Stump also produced the majority of their album The Quilt, which was released on September 9, 2008, and peaked at #14 on the U.S. Billboard 200 chart and #41 on the UK Albums Chart. In 2009, McCoy remixed the Bring Me the Horizon song "Chelsea Smile" for their remixes album, Suicide Season: Cut Up!. McCoy and Gym Class Heroes released a new album, The Papercut Chronicles II, in November 2011.

Solo career

McCoy began a solo career in 2010. He denied rumors that Gym Class Heroes had broken up, asserting that "Since the inception of Gym Class in 1997, every member has had another musical outlet, if not three or four. This is just another one of those."  McCoy had originally prepared to record an introspective album of "sad and somber" acoustic songs reflective of his state of mind following his breakup with Katy Perry and his addiction to painkillers.  However, he decided to scrap his early material and start over, calling the early material "too personal." He explained, "I didn't want that to be my first look as a solo artist," and compared the album to Kanye West's 808s & Heartbreak.

He relocated to Miami, Florida, to record new material and recover from his addiction, which helped him to create a more upbeat album because he "want[ed] to do something positive." McCoy decided to officially call himself "Travie" instead of Travis; he explained that he has been called Travie by friends and family for "as long as [he] can remember." He believes that the new name allows listeners to become "that much closer" to him and to "feel much more comfortable with calling me Travie and being part of the family."

In early May 2010, McCoy released the hit single "Billionaire" with Bruno Mars, which has been successful in Europe and the U.S. since its release. McCoy released his first solo album, Lazarus on June 8, 2010, after being in the works for a year and a half.  He calls the album "The longest, I think, I've spent on a record in my whole career."  He stated that he wanted to keep the number of collaborations on the album "kinda tight," but he plans to work with other artists on remixes of the album.  Producers on the album include Bruno Mars, T-Pain, The Smeezingtons, The Stereotypes, Lucas Secon, Oligee and Josh Abraham; Mars, T-Pain and Cee Lo Green provide guest vocals.

The album debuted at number 25 on the U.S. Billboard 200 chart with sales of 15,000 copies. On August 21, 2010 Lazarus was released in Europe and entered the UK Album Charts at number 69, its peak position thus far. "Need You" was the second single from the album in the U.S, released in September 2010. "We'll Be Alright" was released on October 25, 2010, as the second single in the UK. It was featured in the movie trailer of Yogi Bear. In July and August 2010, McCoy supported Rihanna on some of the North American dates of her Last Girl on Earth Tour. McCoy and Bruno Mars embarked on a 13-date tour of Europe throughout October and November. They played five dates in the United Kingdom, four in Germany and one each in the Netherlands, Denmark, Sweden and France. McCoy performed at the 2010 MTV VMAs on September 12, 2010, on the main stage before the program cut to a performance by N.E.R.D. In November 2010, McCoy performed on the Australian Summerbeatz tour alongside Flo Rida, Jay Sean and Soulja Boy. "Billionaire" was performed on the September 21, 2010, episode of Glee. McCoy was a guest star on the sitcom "Shell Games", the third episode of Malibu Country, and sang with Reba McEntire.

McCoy is featured on the remix of teen-pop singer Jessica Jarrell's debut single "Up and Running," on the singer's upcoming debut album on Island Records. McCoy is also featured on Livin's City of Brotherly Love album, scheduled to be released in early 2011 on 700 Level Entertainment. The track "When I Approach" features Livin, McCoy and Joe Budden, and is produced by Sev-One. A video released on YouTube showed McCoy recording the song. In mid-2010 he worked with producer Starsmith and British singer Cheryl Cole for her upcoming album. He is featured on the track "Yeah Yeah" of Cole's album Messy Little Raindrops. In November 2010, McCoy collaborated with English R&B artist Taio Cruz on Cruz's single "Higher". He performed "Stereo Hearts" with Adam Levine of Maroon 5 on November 5, 2011, on Saturday Night Live. Gym Class Heroes performed the song with Levine at the American Music Awards of 2011 as well. In January 2012, McCoy collaborated with English Girl Group Stooshe with their single Love Me. On April 24, 2012, McCoy's song with ex Hollywood Undead singer, Deuce, was released on Deuce's album Nine Lives. The title of the track is "I Came to Party".

In 2013, Travie McCoy released "Rough Water", a single with Jason Mraz. On March 23, 2014, McCoy released the single "Keep On Keeping On" with Panic! at the Disco lead singer Brendon Urie. The music video for the song premiered on Idolator and YouTube on March 24. He features on Olly Murs' hit single "Wrapped Up", released in October 2014.

In 2021, McCoy signed with Hopeless Records and released his first single in six years "A Spoonful of Cinnamon" on June 18.

Personal life
In early March 2007, McCoy opened up about his battles with opioids. He stated that he had been addicted to pharmaceuticals since he was 15 years old.  The death of his best friend in 2007 led McCoy to retreat further into his addiction, leading him to "dive into drugs face-first." He went through his second stint in a detox program, and claimed that his opiate receptors had been cleaned. He said of the experience, "I feel like a layer of shit has been peeled off of my brain." On his blog, he also stated that "I felt an enormous amount of guilt for glorifying drug use in our music."

On July 2, 2008, McCoy was arrested after hitting a man on the head with his microphone. The man had been in the crowd at a concert in St. Louis when he shouted racial slurs at McCoy. McCoy asked the man, "What did you just call me?" As security was removing the man from the venue, McCoy brought the man on stage to call him out in front of the crowd. In a statement, McCoy's publicist said that the man hit McCoy's knee, which was in a brace after he had suffered a recent strain. McCoy was later charged with third-degree assault and a warrant issued for his arrest. On October 28, 2010, McCoy was arrested again while on tour in Berlin, Germany for tagging the Berlin Wall. He was later released on €1,500 bail ($2,081), and continued on his European tour in Amsterdam. He later posted a picture of the artwork on his Twitter account.

McCoy dated singer Katy Perry for over two years. After they split up in December 2008, they briefly reconciled before Perry ended their relationship via email due to his drug addiction in 2009. In late November 2006, she played his love interest in the music video for "Cupid's Chokehold". McCoy is allegedly the subject of Perry's song "Circle the Drain" from her 2010 album Teenage Dream. In 2012, McCoy said of their relationship: "I chose drugs over our relationship... As things started taking off for her the more I started to doubt my role in her life. There were times I felt like a stepping ladder."

Discography
 

 Lazarus (2010)
 Never Slept Better (2022)

References

External links

 
 
 Travis McCoy's tumblr

1981 births
Living people
American people of Irish descent
American rappers of Haitian descent
21st-century American singers
American hip hop singers
American male rappers
American rock singers
Crush Management artists
Gym Class Heroes members
People from Geneva, New York
Rappers from New York (state)
Songwriters from New York (state)
21st-century American rappers
21st-century American male singers
Pop rappers
Fueled by Ramen artists
Hopeless Records artists
American male songwriters
American people who self-identify as being of Native American descent